The 55th Ariel Awards ceremony, organized by the Mexican Academy of Film Arts and Sciences (AMACC) took place in 2013, in Mexico City. During the ceremony, AMACC presented the Ariel Award in 23 categories honoring films released in 2012. La vida precoz y breve de Sabina Rivas received eleven nominations and won three awards including Best Supporting Actress for Angelina Peláez. El Premio was named Best Picture and Rodrigo Plá was awarded Best Director.

Awards
Winners are listed first and highlighted with boldface

Multiple nominations and awards

The following films received multiple nominations:

Films that received multiple awards:

References

Ariel Awards ceremonies
2013 film awards
2013 in Mexican cinema